Imre Trencsényi-Waldapfel (16 June 1908 – 3 June 1970) was a Hungarian classical scholar and member of the Hungarian Academy of Sciences.

Trencsényi-Waldapfel studied the history of religion, philosophy, and epics. He was a specialist in ancient mythology including the Danae-myth, Golden Age myths, the Hesiodic prooemia, the Homeric epics of Central Asia, particularly the Kazakh epics and the Christopher legend. His scholarship combined Greek, Latin and Oriental sources together with fine art to tell the story.

Selected publications
Erasmus és magyar barátai, Officina, Budapest, 1941.
Humanizmus és nemzeti irodalom, Akadémiai Kiadó, Budapest, 1966.
Mitológia, Gondolat, Budapest, 1968.

References

20th-century Hungarian historians
Academic staff of the University of Szeged
Members of the Hungarian Academy of Sciences
Writers from Budapest
1908 births
1970 deaths
20th-century Hungarian male writers
Hungarian classical scholars